Torture is the infliction of physical or psychological pain to punish or coerce an action from the victim.

Torture or Tortured may also refer to:

Music

Albums
Torture (album), by Cannibal Corpse, 2012
Tortured, by Annette Ducharme, 1997

Songs
"Torture" (The Jacksons song), 1984
"Torture", written by John D. Loudermilk, notably recorded by Kris Jensen and by Petula Clark
"Torture", by Abraham Mateo from Who I AM, 2014
"Torture", by Cavalera Conspiracy from Blunt Force Trauma, 2011
"Torture", by the Cure from Kiss Me, Kiss Me, Kiss Me, 1987
"Torture", by Danny Brown from Old, 2013
"Torture", by Method Man from Tical 2000: Judgement Day, 1998
"Torture", by Miyavi from What's My Name?, 2010
"Torture", by the Psychedelic Furs from Midnight to Midnight, 1987
"Tortured", by Loverboy from Six, 1997
"Tortured", by OTEP from Sevas Tra, 2002
"Tortured", by the Replacements from All Shook Down, 1990

Other uses
Torture (journal), a medical journal covering rehabilitation of torture victims and prevention of torture
Tortured (film), a 2008 film starring Laurence Fishburne

See also
 
Animal abuse
 BDSM
 Sadomasochism
 Torture murder